The Battle of Gabon (French: Bataille du Gabon), also called the Gabon Campaign (Campagne du Gabon), occurred in November 1940 during World War II. The battle resulted in forces under the orders of General de Gaulle taking the colony of Gabon and its capital, Libreville, from Vichy France, and the rallying of French Equatorial Africa to Free France.

Background
In June 1940, Germany invaded and defeated France, and subsequently occupied a portion of the country. Philippe Pétain established a collaborationist government in Vichy to administer unoccupied French territory. On 18 June French General Charles De Gaulle broadcast an appeal over the radio to his compatriots abroad, calling on them to reject the Vichy regime and join the United Kingdom in its war against Germany and Italy. The broadcast provoked division in France's African territories, where colonists were forced to choose sides.

On 26 August, the governor and military commanders in the colony of French Chad announced that they were rallying to De Gaulle's Free French Forces. A small group of Gaullists seized control of French Cameroon the following morning, and on 28 August a Free French official ousted the pro-Vichy governor of French Congo. The next day the governor of Ubangi-Shari declared that his territory would support De Gaulle. His declaration prompted a brief struggle for power with a pro-Vichy army officer, but by the end of the day all of the colonies that formed French Equatorial Africa had rallied to Free France, except for French Gabon. On the evening of 28–29 August 1940, Governor Georges Masson had pledged Gabon's allegiance to Free France. He met immediate opposition from much of Libreville's French population and from Gabon's influential, conservative Catholic bishop, Louis Tardy, who favoured Vichy France's anti-Freemason policies. Facing pressure, Masson was forced to rescind his pledge. Free French sympathizers were subsequently arrested by the colonial administration and either imprisoned on board the auxiliary cruiser  or deported to Dakar, Senegal. De Gaulle was perturbed by Gabon's refusal to join his cause and described his dilemma in his memoirs: "a hostile enclave, that was hard to reduce because it gave on to the ocean, was created in the heart of our equatorial holdings." General Edgard de Larminat stated that the failure to secure the territory would threaten "the very principle of our presence in Africa."

Prelude
Following the rallying of Cameroon on 27 August, the Gabonese authorities decided to reinforce their frontier with that province along with the Ntem river. On 3 September, Roger Gardet entered Bitam by a ruse. On the pretext of medical necessity, he received permission from Captain Gourvès at Bitam to cross the frontier. Gourvès agreed to rally his troops to Free France only if his superior, the chief administrator of Woleu-Ntem based at Oyem, a certain Besson, did the same. Besson at first refused, but on 5 September Gardet informed him that he was relieving him of his command. Besson left for Cameroon and the following day, 6 September, Free French forces arrived in Bitam and Oyem with Pierre Roger Martocq as the new administrator of Woleu-Ntem.

On 11 September, Masson held a meeting with his army and navy commanders at which it was decided to reinforce Mayumba. On 9 and 15 September, Colonel André Parant brought a dozen Free French fighters into Mayumba on a Potez 540. On 15 September, the Vichy reinforcements arrived on the Cap des Palmes, escorted by the submarine : a troop of marines from the aviso  and the defence of Port-Gentil. While the commander of the submarine, Captain Bertrand de Saussine du Pont de Gault was breakfasting with the district administrator, the Free French invaded the administrator's residence. After several hours of discussions, and with Parant's men occupying the city, Saussine was permitted to leave, taking with him whoever did not wish to join the Free French. Most of the marines opted to stay in Mayumba.

On 8 October, De Gaulle arrived in Douala, Cameroon. Four days later he authorised plans for the invasion of French Equatorial Africa. He wanted to use French Equatorial Africa as a base to launch attacks into Axis-controlled Libya. For this reason, he personally headed northward to survey the situation in Chad, located on the southern border of Libya.

Battle

On 27 October, Free French forces crossed into French Equatorial Africa and took the town of Mitzic.

On 5 November, the Vichy garrison at Lambaréné capitulated. Meanwhile, the main Free French forces under General Philippe Leclerc and Battalion Chief (major) Marie Pierre Koenig departed from Douala, French Cameroon. Their goal was to take Libreville, French Equatorial Africa. The British expressed doubt in De Gaulle's ability to establish control over the Vichy territory, but they eventually agreed to lend naval support to the Free French. French Foreign Legion officer John Hasey reported that after the first few days of fighting, 150 prisoners were taken who joined the Free French a few weeks later – "curiously enough, no one tried to convince them. They argued it out among themselves and joined up voluntarily."

On 8 November 1940, the  sloop  discovered the Vichy  submarine  shadowing the Anglo-French task force and gave chase. The sloop was too slow to intercept the submarine, so Admiral Cunningham ordered his flagship, to launch its Supermarine Walrus biplane. The aircraft straddled the submarine with two salvos of  depth charges as it attempted to dive, damaging it. It was then scuttled off Port-Gentil, with the captain resolving to sink with his vessel. Koenig's forces landed at Pointe La Mondah on the night of 8 November. His forces included French Legionnaires (including the 13th Foreign Legion Demi-Brigade), Senegalese and Cameroonian troops.

On 9 November, Free French Westland Lysander aircraft operating out of Douala bombed Libreville aerodrome. The aerodrome was eventually captured, despite stiff resistance met by Koenig's force in its approach. De Brazza attacked and sank her sister ship, the Vichy French Bougainville. Libreville was captured on 10 November.

On 12 November, the final Vichy forces at Port Gentil surrendered without a fight. Governor Georges Masson – despairing of his actions – committed suicide.

Aftermath
The Free French lost four aircraft and six aircrew in the campaign. There is disagreement about the total number of human losses. De Gaulle said "some twenty" died in the campaign. Jean-Christophe Notin claimed 33 were killed. Eliane Ebako wrote that "dozens" lost their lives, while Jean-Pierre Azéma said "roughly one hundred" were killed. Another account states that 35 Vichy troops were killed to 8 Free French.

On 15 November, de Gaulle made a personal appeal that failed to persuade most of the captured Vichy soldiers—including General —to join the Free French. As a result, they were interned as prisoners of war in Brazzaville, French Congo for the duration of the war.

With their control consolidated in Equatorial Africa, the Free French began focusing on the campaign in Italian Libya. De Gaulle relieved General Leclerc of his post in Cameroon and sent him to Fort Lamy, Chad to oversee offensive preparations.

The conflict in Gabon triggered a mass migration of Gabonese to Spanish Guinea. French Equatorial Africa cut its ties with the Vichy-controlled West African territories, and rebuilt its economy around trade with nearby British possessions, namely Nigeria. Tensions between Vichy and Free French factions remained long after the invasion. The seizure of Gabon and the rest of French Equatorial Africa gave Free France new-found legitimacy; no longer was it an organization of exiles in Britain, as it now had its own sizable territory to govern.

Notes

Citations

References

Further reading
Ebako, Éliane. Le ralliement du Gabon à la France libre: Une guerre franco-française, septembre–décembre 1940. PhD thesis. University of Paris IV, 2004.
Labat, René. Le Gabon devant le Gaullisme. Paris: Delmas, 1941.
La vérité sur l'affaire du Gabon, Septembre–Octobre–Novembre 1940: Allocutions prononcées à la chambre de commerce de Dakar le 4 avril 1941 par MM. Chamussuy, Aumasson et Boisson. Dakar: Grande imprimerie africaine, 1941.

External links
Free French order of battle 

1940 in French Equatorial Africa
Battles and operations of World War II
Military battles of Vichy France
Battles of World War II involving France
Naval battles of World War II involving France
Naval battles and operations of World War II involving the United Kingdom
Conflicts in 1940
French Equatorial Africa
History of Gabon
November 1940 events